In model checking, a subfield of computer science, a clock is a mathematical object used to model time. More precisely, a clock measures how much time passed since a particular event occurs, in this sense, a clock is more precisely an abstraction of a stopwatch. In a model of some particular program, the value of the clock may either be the time since the program was started, or the time since a particular event occurred in the program. Those clocks are used in the definition of timed automaton, signal automaton, timed propositional temporal logic and clock temporal logic. They are also used in programs such as UPPAAL which implement timed automata.

Generally, the model of a system uses many clocks. Those multiple clocks are required in order to track a bounded number of events. All of those clocks are synchronized. That means that the difference in value between two fixed clocks is constant until one of them is restarted. In the language of electronics, it means that clock's jitter is null.

Example 
Let us assume that we want to modelize an elevator in a building with ten floors. Our model may have  clocks , such that the value of the clock  is the time someone had wait for the elevator at floor . This clock is started when someone calls the elevator on floor  (and the elevator was not already called on this floor since last time it visited that floor). This clock can be turned off when the elevator arrives at floor . In this example, we actually need ten distinct clocks because we need to track ten independent events. Another clock  may be used to check how much time an elevator spent at a particular floor.

A model of this elevator can then use those clocks to assert whether the elevator's program satisfies properties such as "assuming the elevator is not kept on a floor for more than fifteen seconds, then no one has to wait for the elevator for more than three minutes". In order to check whether this statement holds, it suffices to check that, in every run of the model in which the clock  is always smaller than fifteen seconds, each clock  is turned off before it reaches three minutes.

Definition 
Formally, a set  of clocks is simply a finite set. Each element of a set of clock is called a clock. Intuitively, a clock is similar to a variable in first-order logic, it is an element which may be used in a logical formula and which may takes a number of differente values.

Clock valuations 

The initial assignment  is the constant function sending each clock to 0. Intuitively, it represents the initial time of the program, where each clocks are initialized simultaneously.

Intuitively, it represents the valuation  after which  time units passed.

Inactive clocks 
The program UPPAAL introduce the notion of inactive clocks. A clock is inactive at some time if there is no possible future in which the clock's value is checked without being reset first. In our example above, the clock  is considered to be inactive when the elevator arrive at floor , and remains inactive until someone call the elevator at floor .

When allowing for inactive clock, a valuation may associate a clock  to some special value  to indicate that it is inactive. If  then  also equals .

Clock constraint 
A valuation  satisfies an atomic clock valuation  if and only if .

A clock constraint is either a finite conjunction of atomic clock constraint or is the constant "true" (which can be considered as the empty conjunction). A valuation  satisfies a clock constraint  if it satisfies each atomic clock constraint .

Diagonal constraint 
Depending on the context, an atomic clock constraint may also be of the form .

Allowing diagonal constraints may allow to decrease the size of a formula or of an automaton used to describe a system. However, algorithm's complexity may increase when diagonal constraints are allowed. In most system using clocks, allowing diagonal constraint does not increase the expressivity of the logic. We now explain how to encode such constraint with Boolean variable and non-diagonal constraint.

A diagonal constraint  may be simulated using non-diagonal constraint as follows. When  is reset, check whether  holds or not. Recall this information in a Boolean variable  and replace  by this variable.

The way to encode a Boolean variable depends on the system which uses the clock. For example, UPPAAL supports Boolean variables directly. Timed automata and signal automata can encode a Boolean value in their locations. In clock temporal logic over timed words, the Boolean variable may be encoded using a new clock , whose value is 0 if and only if  is false.

Sets defined by clock constraints  
A clock constraint defines a set of valuations. Two kinds of such sets are considered in the literature.

A zone is a non-empty set of valuations satisfying a clock constraint. Zones and clock constraints are implemented using difference bound matrix.

Given a model  , it uses a finite number of constants in its clock constraints. Let  be the greatest constant used.

See also 
 Timed automaton
 Signal automaton
 Clock temporal logic
 Timed propositional temporal logic

Notes 

Automata (computation)
Model checking